Rapture is the fifth full-length album of the Finnish black metal band Impaled Nazarene. It was released in 1998 on Osmose Productions.

Track listing
All Lyrics By Mika Luttinen, except where noted.  All Music As Noted.
 "Penis et Circes"  – 2:35 (Music: Jani Lehtosaari)
 "6th Degree Mindfuck"  – 2:30 (Music: Lehtosaari)
 "Iron Fist with an Iron Will"  – 2:27 (Music & Lyrics: Mika Luttinen)
 "Angel Rectums Do Bleed"  – 2:00 (Music: Jarmo Anttila)
 "We're Satan's Generation"  – 2:23 (Music: Luttinen)
 "Goatvomit and Gasmasks"  – 3:31 (Music: Reima Kellokoski)
 "Fallout Theory in Practice"  – 2:22 (Music: Kellokoski)
 "Healers of the Red Plague"  – 3:37 (Music: Lahtosaari)
 "The Pillory"  – 2:01 (Lyrics & Music: Impaled Nazarene)
 "The Return of Nuclear Gods"  – 2:58 (Music: Anttila)
 "Vitutation"  – 3:22 (Music: Lehtosaari)
 "JCS"  – 2:29 (Music: Kellokoski)
 "Inbred"  – 1:37 (Music: Kellokoski)
 "Phallus Maleficarum"  – 5:45 (Music: Anttila)

Personnel
 Mika Luttinen - Vocals
 Jarno Anttila - Guitar
 Jani Lehtosaari - Bass
 Reima Kellokoski - Drums, Additional Guitars

Production
Arranged & Produced By Impaled Nazarene
Recorded, Engineered & Mixed By Ahti Hokemaa
Mastered By Pauli Saastamoinen

External links
"Rapture" at discogs

1998 albums
Impaled Nazarene albums
Osmose Productions albums